Tumor protein D52 is a protein that in humans is encoded by the TPD52L1 gene.

Function 
This gene encodes a member of the tumor protein D52 (TPD52) family. The encoded protein contains a coiled-coil domain and may form homo- or hetero-dimer with TPD52 family members. The protein is reported to be involved in cell proliferation and calcium signaling. It also interacts with the mitogen-activated protein kinase kinase kinase 5 (MAP3K5/ASK1) and positively regulates MAP3K5-induced apoptosis. Multiple alternatively spliced transcript variants have been observed, but the full-length nature of some variants has not yet been determined.

Interactions 
TPD52L1 has been shown to interact with TPD52L2 and TPD52.

References

Further reading